Paralithaioi is a former municipality in the Trikala regional unit, Thessaly, Greece. Since the 2011 local government reform it is part of the municipality Trikala, of which it is a municipal unit. The municipal unit has an area of 98.052 km2. Population 2,660 (2011). The seat of the municipality was in Rizoma.

References

Populated places in Trikala (regional unit)

el:Δήμος Τρικκαίων#Παραληθαίων